Adachi Morinaga (安達 盛長) (1135–1200) was a Japanese warrior from the Adachi clan who fought for Minamoto no Yoritomo against the Taira.  Morinaga had already supported Yoritomo while he lived in exile in Izu province.  After the wars, he became a monk and took the name Rensai (蓮西).

Japanese warrior monks
1135 births
1200 deaths
Adachi clan